Electrocapillarity or electrocapillary phenomena are the phenomena related to changes in the surface energy (or interfacial tension) of the dropping mercury electrode (DME), or in principle, any electrode, as the electrode potential changes or the electrolytic solution composition and concentration change. The term "electro-capillary" is used to describe the change in mercury (Hg) electrode potential as a function of the change in the surface or interfacial tension of the Hg determined by the capillary rise  method. The phenomena are the historic main contributions for understanding and validating the models of the structure of the electrical double layer. The phenomena are related to the electrokinetic phenomena and consequently to the colloid chemistry.

Interfacial tension

The interfacial (surface) tension, St, (dyne cm−1), can be calculated by applying the equation of capillary rise method (when the contact angle Ө → 0):

where:
 h (cm) is the height of Hg column above the Hg meniscus in the capillary
 r (cm) is the radius of capillary
 g is the acceleration due to gravity
 d (g cm−3) is the Hg density

The circuit contains Hg electrode as the ideally polarizable electrode and a reference electrode as the non-polarizable electrode. Thus, when an external voltage is applied, only EM/S of Hg/solution fluid interface is changed.

See also
 Colloid chemistry
 Electrical double layer
 Electrokinetic phenomena
 Liquid metal electrode
 Rotating disk electrode

References

 Modern Electrochemistry, Volume 2, J.O'M. Bockris and A.K.N. Reddy, Plenum/Rosetta Edition, 2000.
 Theoretical Electrochemistry, L.I. Antropov, English Edition, Mir Publishers, Moscow.

Electrochemistry